The Art, Design & Architecture Museum (AD&A), formerly the University Art Museum (UAM), is located on the campus of the UCSB in Goleta, California, United States.  Built in 1959, it was originally a gallery for art education at UCSB. Today the AD&A contains a fine art collection of over 8,500 works.

Collection
Other than the 8,500 original works the AD&A also possesses over 1,000,000 architectural drawings, historic photographs, writings, scrapbooks, and three-dimensional objects in the Architecture and Design Collection.

The museum's digital collections were enhanced during the COVID-19 crisis so that audiences could continue to enjoy its resources while quarantine was in place.

Mission statement
The mission of the Art, Design & Architecture Museum at the University of California, Santa Barbara, is to serve as a unique educational resource for the various audiences of the university and the community through the collection, preservation, and interpretation of works of art, architecture, and design. By presenting innovative, challenging, and culturally diverse exhibitions, producing catalogues and other publications, and organizing interdisciplinary programs on issues of historical, social, and cultural relevance, the AD&A seeks to promote scholarship, inspire creative excellence, and deepen an understanding of the visual arts produced by the world's peoples, past and present.

References

External links

 Art, Design & Architecture Museum - official site

Art museums established in 1959
University of California, Santa Barbara buildings and structures
University museums in California
Museums in Santa Barbara County, California
Art museums and galleries in California
1959 establishments in California
Architecture museums in the United States
Design museums in the United States
Goleta, California